The Phi Delta Theta Fraternity House is a historic fraternity house located at the University of Illinois at Urbana–Champaign in Champaign, Illinois. The house was built in 1922 for the university's Illinois Eta chapter of the Phi Delta Theta fraternity, which was chartered in 1893. The fraternity was noted for its involvement in student life activities, particularly the university's sports teams. Prominent Chicago architect Howard Van Doren Shaw designed the house in the English Revival style. The house's design includes a steep gable roof with intersecting gables on either side, an ashlar limestone exterior, and a recessed loggia supported by columns at the front entrance.

The house was added to the National Register of Historic Places on February 25, 2004.

References

Residential buildings on the National Register of Historic Places in Illinois
National Register of Historic Places in Champaign County, Illinois
Residential buildings completed in 1922
Buildings and structures of the University of Illinois Urbana-Champaign
Fraternity and sorority houses
Buildings and structures in Champaign, Illinois